Pillsbury Mountain is a mountain in the Adirondack Mountains region of New York. It is located in Hamilton County. The Pillsbury Mountain Forest Fire Observation Station is located on top of the mountain.

External links
The Fire Towers of New York

References

Adirondacks
Tourist attractions in Hamilton County, New York
Mountains of Hamilton County, New York
Mountains of New York (state)